Reckless Kelly is a 1993 Australian comedy film produced, written, directed and starring Yahoo Serious. It co-stars Melora Hardin, Alexei Sayle and Hugo Weaving. The story is a satirical take on a modern-day Ned Kelly, a famous Australian outlaw.

Synopsis 
A modern-day Ned Kelly robs banks in Australia and gives all the money to the poor people. Ned is forced to go to Hollywood to make enough money to save his family's land. As it goes against his belief, he cannot simply rob banks there for his own benefit. Ned is forced to find another way to come up with the $1 million required to save his family island. That is when a movie producer shows up and gives Ned an offer he cannot refuse.

Cast 
 Yahoo Serious ... Ned Kelly
 Melora Hardin ... Robin Banks
 Alexei Sayle ... Major Wib
 Hugo Weaving ... Sir John
 Kathleen Freeman ... Mrs. Delance
 John Pinette ... Sam Delance
 Bob Maza ... Dan Kelly
 Martin Ferrero ... Ernie the Fan
 Anthony Ackroyd ... Joe Kelly
 Max Walker ... Newsreader

Production 
The film was financed by Warner Bros, Village Roadshow and the Australian Film Finance Corporation. Serious used many of the same key creatives he had on Young Einstein.

Reception 
Neil Jillett, film critic for The Age wrote, "There are some good gags along the way, and a few of the plot's twists have an entertainingly surreal zaniness. But there is much heavy going too. Most of the messages Serious loads into the film—protect the environment, hate violence and banks, mock the British, go for a republic, sneer at American fads and religious hypocrisy—are presented with a smugness that was missing from Young Einstein".

Box office 
Reckless Kelly opened at number one at the Australian box office with a gross of $2,036,224. It remained at number one for a second week and went on to gross $5,444,534 at the Australian box office.

In popular culture 
 Australian rock duo Divinyls covered the song "Wild Thing" in 1993 for the soundtrack to the film. It peaked at No. 39 on the Australian Singles Chart.

See also 
 Cinema of Australia

References

External links 
 
 
Reckless Kelly at Oz Movies
 
 
 RECKLESS KELLY : 1ST RE-CUT VERSION (Australian video release) at the National Film and Sound Archive
RECKLESS KELLY : 2ND RE-CUT VERSION (U.S.A. film release) at the National Film and Sound Archive

1993 films
Australian Western (genre) comedy films
Australian satirical films
1990s English-language films
Films set in Los Angeles
Films shot in Australia
1993 comedy films
Films scored by Anthony Marinelli
Warner Bros. films
Cultural depictions of Ned Kelly
Films directed by Yahoo Serious